"Beep Beep" is a novelty single by the Playmates, released in 1958 by Roulette Records (catalog number 4115) as the B-side to "Your Love".  The song describes an unintended road race between two mismatched cars.

Production
"Beep Beep" was written by Carl Cicchetti and Donald Claps, also known as Chic Hetti and Donny Conn, the band's arranger/pianist and drummer, respectively.

The song is built around accelerando: The tempo of the song gradually increases commensurate with the increasing speed of the drivers.  In his book The Guide to United States Popular Culture, Ray B. Browne lists "Beep Beep" as an example of "motoring music [...] in the chase mode".  It is a tortoise-and-the-hare race, substituting the drivers of two unequal cars, originally a Nash Rambler and Cadillac, respectively.

Roulette Records did not want to release the song as a single, because the song changed tempo, it explicitly named contemporary products on the market, and was not danceable; when disc jockeys began playing it off the album, it forced the label's hand, and Roulette released the 45 single.  Because of a contemporary BBC directive that prohibited songs with brand names in their lyrics, a UK version of "Beep Beep" was recorded for the European market, replacing the Cadillac and Nash Rambler with the generic terms limousine and bubble car; this recut version was also released in the US for radio stations with similar policies about product placement.

Reception
"Beep Beep" began charting with Billboard on November 3, 1958; it charted for 15 weeks, peaking at number four.  After the single sold one million copies (The Playmates' only), it was awarded a gold disc by the Recording Industry Association of America.  The Playmates were scheduled to perform their song on the December 3, 1958 episode of The Milton Berle Show.

In December 1958, Time credited the popularity "Beep Beep" with helping Nash Motors break records.  In November 1958, the company doubled its previous year's production record with 26,782 cars; Ramblers accounted for 9.2% of October 1958's automobile sales in the United States; and though "total U.S. exports slid 16% in 1958, Rambler's climbed 10.3%."  "Beep Beep" was also popular with the workers building Ramblers on AMC's assembly lines in Kenosha, Wisconsin.

References

External links
 
 

1958 singles
1958 songs
novelty songs
Roulette Records singles
songs about cars